The 1978 New Zealand Grand Prix was a race held at the Pukekohe Park Raceway on 7 January 1978.  The race had 20 starters.

It was the 24th New Zealand Grand Prix. The race was won by future Formula One World Champion Keke Rosberg for the second time in succession in the Chevron B39. The rest of the podium was completed by Australian Larry Perkins and American Danny Sullivan.

Classification

Qualifying

Race

References

Grand Prix
New Zealand Grand Prix
January 1978 sports events in New Zealand